The 1910 Wyoming gubernatorial election was held on November 8, 1910. Incumbent Republican Governor Bryant B. Brooks declined to seek re-election. The leading Republican candidates to succeed him were initially former U.S. Senator Joseph M. Carey and Attorney General William E. Mullen. However, shortly before the Republican convention, Carey announced he would instead run as an independent candidate. Shortly thereafter, Mullen was formally nominated by the Republican Party. A week later, at the Democratic convention, Carey was named as the Democratic nominee for Governor. In the general election matchup between Carey and Mullen, Cary won a sizable victory, winning every county in the state, a feat that no other Democratic nominee would accomplish until Dave Freudenthal in 2006.

Party conventions
In the summer of 1910, former U.S. Senator Joseph M. Carey announced that he would run for Governor as a Republican. At the time, he denied any interest in running as an independent candidate if he lost the Republican nomination, affirming that he would only run as a Republican. State Attorney General William E. Mullen announced his campaign shortly thereafter, and called for the repeal of state legislation that limited the sale of alcohol outside of incorporated towns and cities.

Prior to the start of the Republican convention, Carey announced that he would instead run as an independent candidate, condemning the "republican state ring" that he alleged had run the state university and penitentiary system for political ends, committed financial fraud with the state's accounts, and had corrupted the state legislature. He called for the enactment of a direct primary law, eliminating the convention method of candidate nomination; the direct election of U.S. senators; and a corrupt practices act. At the Republican convention on September 15, 1910, State Senator Patrick Sullivan was unanimously offered the nomination for Governor, but ultimately declined it, enabling Mullen to instead be named as the nominee.

Subsequently, at the Democratic convention that began on September 20, Carey announced that he would be a candidate for the nomination, facing W. L. Kuykendall. Carey was seen as the frontrunner for the nomination, with a high-level Democrat in the state party noting, "We can swallow Carey if Carey will swallow us" and adopt the state party's platform. Carey was ultimately nominated unanimously, and pledged to financially support the entire state ticket.

General election

Results

Results by county

References

1910 Wyoming elections
1910
Wyoming